Bucculatrix formosa is a moth in the family Bucculatricidae. It is found in the Kugitangtau Mountains in Turkmenistan. It was described in 1992 by Rimantas Puplesis and Svetlana Seksjaeva. 

The length of the forewings is 2.1-2.7 mm. The forewings are covered with a mixture of creamish-white and brown or brownish scales. There are two or three dark brown, irregular spots and some irregular, creamish-white areas. The hindwings are creamish-white. Adults have been recorded on wing from August to September.

References

Bucculatricidae
Moths described in 1992
Moths of Asia